Yasser Al-Mohammed (born 16 November 1989) is a Saudi football player. He currently plays as a midfielder for Al-Jeel.

References

1989 births
Living people
Saudi Arabian footballers
Al-Nahda Club (Saudi Arabia) players
Najran SC players
Al-Watani Club players
Al-Fayha FC players
Al-Diriyah Club players
Al-Sadd FC (Saudi football club) players
Al-Najma SC players
Al-Ansar FC (Medina) players
Al-Rayyan Club (Saudi Arabia) players
Wej SC players
Place of birth missing (living people)
Saudi First Division League players
Saudi Professional League players
Saudi Second Division players
Association football midfielders